Martin Ramon Razon Nievera (born February5, 1962) is a Filipino-American singer and television host. In his career spanning more than three decades, he has numerous PARI-certified platinum albums, including eighteen platinum, five double platinum, three triple platinum, and one quadruple platinum albums.

Often referred as the "Concert King" locally, Nievera is a household name in the Philippine music industry, he is one of the original mainstay cast of the variety show ASAP Natin 'To since 1995.  Nievera has also appeared as a judge on The X Factor Philippines and a coach on the Philippine version of The Voice Kids.

Early life
Martin Ramon Razon Nievera was born on February5, 1962 in Manila to singer Bert Nievera and Conchita Razon. He has a twin sister, Victoria (nicknamed "Vicki"); a younger sister, Rachel; and many siblings from his parents' other unions. His father was a member of the Hawaii-based singing troupe Society of Seven. His mother separated with her first husband and fled with the twins to Hawaii when they were three years old to live there with Bert.  Attending elementary and high school in Hawaii, he said that he was regularly bullied by his classmates because of his appearance and "I wore a belt and shoes, so they thought belt and shoes meant mayaman ka [you are rich]. I would get beaten up for my lunch money, so my twin sister Vicki would defend me in school. The following day mas nabugbog ako [I was beaten more] because na-defend ako ng babae [I was defended by a girl]."

Nievera developed an interest in music, particularly in singing, at an early age. In their first year in Hawaii, the family resided on the fifteenth floor of the Outrigger Hotel, and the young Nievera "would watch him [his father] perform downstairs with the Society of Seven, and every night I would dream and imagine myself as one of the members of that group, singing for audiences both big and small." While working as a burger flipper at a restaurant that his family owned in Hawaii or at another family-owned restaurant, called Roadrunner Burgers, in Concord, California (where they would eventually move to), Nievera received singing lessons from his father, learning "how and when to belt and how to end the song in a big way." By the age of fourteen, he was performing with him in Society of Seven shows. Nievera said in 2018, "It all happened in the main showroom in that Outrigger Hotel[...] That room is now known as the Blue Note Hawaii, and I still perform there to this day. It has become a very sacred room for me probably because that's where dad gave me my first set of wings."

In the 1970s, the family relocated to the San Francisco Bay Area in California. Nievera enrolled at Clayton Valley High School in Concord, where he was a member of the basketball team. He was encouraged by the school's wrestling coach to enter the choir, impressed by a rendition of Morris Albert's "Feelings" that Nievera sang while showering in the locker room. Bert posited that his son began to realize "he could sing professionally" when he was sixteen, the same age when he did. Aside from his father, who always supported his singing, Nievera also credits for his talent his Cebuana maternal grandmother, Lourdes Corrales, a famous mezzo-soprano opera singer and radio personality in 1940s Philippines. Unlike his father Bert, his mother Conchita was against his dream, instead wanting him to become a doctor or a lawyer. "She knew what she [his grandmother] and my father went through[...] the [show] business takes a lot out of you," Nievera related and said his mother told him.

Career
After graduating from Clayton Valley in 1980, Nievera joined the 1981 California State Talent Competition in Santa Clara, in which he won. As contestant number 1049, he competed against over four thousand other contestants for "[f]our days long[...] you had to win the first day to compete the second day to compete the third day. The third day was the championship, the fourth day is a championship of all the champions of the different categories. So I won the third day, then I won the overall grand champion." Nievera said of his victory, "It was a big moment in my life. That was when I knew I was gonna be a singer." His winning piece was "The Greatest Love of All", which his father taught him at the restaurant.

In 1980c.1982, Nievera was chosen to perform with American singer Barry Manilow at his three-day concert in Concord Pavilion, singing back-up in a choir to the latter's "One Voice". After this experience, he said, "Okay, I'm gonna be a singer." Around this time, when he was nineteen, Nievera's parents were having problems with their relationship. Nievera resented this and attempted to commit suicide. In a 2011 television interview with Boy Abunda, he recalled going to church and venting his anger on God, screaming "What the hell is happening? What else can I do?"

Inspired by his father, Nievera returned to the Philippines in 1982 to begin his own singing career. By June 1983, he released his first LP, Martin...Take One. Nievera began co-hosting the TV variety show The Penthouse Live! with Pops Fernandez, who would later become his wife. Nievera's second LP was 1984's The Best Gift. In 1987, The Penthouse Live! was changed to Martin and Pops Twogether, in celebration of their marriage. His recording Forever led to two sequels, Forever Forever and Return to Forever.

As an actor, Nievera has appeared in eleven films, and seven television series and specials. Nievera's film credits include dramas, romance, science fiction, comedy and action. He also became one of the jocks at the now defunct radio station 101.1 Kiss FM in 1985, wherein he had his own radio show aired every Saturday afternoons.

He appeared with Hawaii's Society of Seven and Lani Misalucha at the Flamingo Las Vegas from February 13 to April 13, 2008. He performed a pre-Valentine/post-birthday concert with Pops Fernandez titled "Missing You" on February 6, 2009, at the Smart Araneta Coliseum. He co-hosts the weekly music show ASAP on ABS-CBN since 1995.

In July 2010, Nievera's album, As Always was released. In May 2011, his album, Himig ng Damdamin was launched and contains all of his covers. In March 2012, he was announced as one of the four celebrity judges of The X Factor Philippines, which aired on ABS-CBN by the second quarter of 2012.

In 2018, Nievera won the Myx Magna Award at the Myx Music Awards for his contributions to music as a singer and also for being a talk show host and comedian.

In 2023, Nievera was selected to be one of the coaches of the fifth season of The Voice Kids aired on A2Z.

Awards and nominations

Discography

Martin... Take One (1983)
The Best Gift (1984)
Martin (1985)
Miracle (1987)
A Martin Nievera Christmas (1988)
Dream (1989)
A New Start (1991)
Roads (1994)
Journeys (1997)
Forever (1998)
Forever, Forever (1999)
Return to Forever (1999)
Chasing Time (2002)
Chasing Time II (2003)
Unforgettable (2004)
When Love is Gone (2005)
Awit ng Puso (2006)
Milestones (2007)
Ikaw Ang Pangarap (2008)
My Christmas List (2008)
For Always (2009)
As 1 (with Gary Valenciano) (2009)
As Always (2010)
Himig ng Damdamin (2010)
Mga Awit at Damdamin (2012)
3D: Tatlong Dekada (2012)
Big Mouth, Big Band (2014)
Kahapon... Ngayon (2016)

Filmography

Television
The Penthouse Live! (19821987)
Mirasol del Cielo (19861987)
Martin and Pops Twogether (19871989)
Martin After Dark (19881998)
ASAP (1995present)
Martin Late at Nite (19982003)
Sabi Nya, Sabi Ko (television film; 2003)
Twist and Shout (2010)
The X Factor Philippines (2012)
Martin Late at Night (2013)
I Love OPM (2016)
LSS: The Martin Nievera Show (2018present); telecast from ANC
The Voice Kids Philippines (2023)

Film
Always and Forever (1986)
Si Mister at Si Misis (1986)
Payaso (1986)
Shoot That Ball (1987)
Maria Went to Town! (1987)
Stupid Cupid (1988)
Sa Puso Ko Hahalik ang Mundo (1988)
Magic to Love (1989)
Adarna: The Mythical Bird (1997)
Alyas Boy Tigas: Ang Probinsyanong Wais (1998)
Masikip sa Dibdib (2004)
Wrinkles (2006)

References

External links

1962 births
20th-century Filipino male actors
20th-century Filipino male singers
21st-century Filipino male actors
21st-century Filipino male singers
ABS-CBN personalities
Baritones
Converts to evangelical Christianity from Roman Catholicism
English-language singers from the Philippines
Filipino evangelicals
Filipino male film actors
Filipino game show hosts
Filipino television talk show hosts
Filipino television variety show hosts
Filipino pop singers
Filipino singer-songwriters
GMA Network personalities
Late night television talk show hosts
Living people
Male actors from California
Male actors from Hawaii
Male actors from Manila
MCA Music Inc. (Philippines) artists
PolyEast Records artists
Singers from California
Singers from Hawaii
Singers from Manila
Songwriters from California
Songwriters from Hawaii
Television personalities from California
Filipino twins
Vicor Music artists